Sela pri Jugorju is a small settlement west of Jugorje in the Municipality of Metlika in the White Carniola area of southeastern Slovenia. The area is part of the traditional region of Lower Carniola and is now included in the Southeast Slovenia Statistical Region. It includes the hamlet of Luža.

References

External links
Sela pri Jugorju on Geopedia

Populated places in the Municipality of Metlika